Two ballot measures were certified for the November 3, 2020, general election in the state of Massachusetts. Multiple other ballot measures that were initiated by supporters did not meet requirements, thus will not appear on the ballot.

The Constitution of Massachusetts can be amended through initiative, and state statutes can be proposed through initiative. In Massachusetts, after the Attorney General determines which measure(s) will appear on the ballot, an official name is assigned to each question. The Secretary of the Commonwealth has discretion over the ordering of questions on the ballot.

Measures on the ballot 
As of April 2020, four measures (19-06, 19–10, 19–11, and 19-14) had achieved the required number of initial signatures and were pending in the Massachusetts General Court. The measures could be passed by the legislature before May 5, 2020, or if that failed to happen, petitioners were required collect an additional 13,347 signatures in support of each measure to be placed on the ballot. Due to the COVID-19 pandemic and the effects of social distancing on in-person signature collection, a lawsuit to allow for electronic signatures in support of ballot initiatives was raised with the Massachusetts Supreme Judicial Court. In late April, a court judgement to allow for electronic signatures was agreed to by Massachusetts Secretary of the Commonwealth William F. Galvin and supporters of the four measures. In early July, supporters of two of the four measures (19-06 and 19-10) announced that they had submitted a sufficient number of signatures to qualify for the ballot. Galvin certified both measures to appear on the 2020 ballot.

Measures not on the ballot 

Several measures were not certified to circulate because they went against Massachusetts law on ballot measures. Others were cleared for circulation but did not collect enough initial signatures for the December 4, 2019 deadline

Despite reaching a sufficient number of signatures in the first round, supporters of two measures (19-11 and 19-14) failed to collect the necessary number of signatures in the second round. By early July both initiatives had "effectively dropped their 2020 efforts".

Polling
Massachusetts Question 1

Massachusetts Question 2

See also
 2019–2020 Massachusetts legislature
 2020 Massachusetts general election
 Direct Democracy in Massachusetts

Notes

References 

 
Ballot